The Phantom is a 1961 American TV film. It was a pilot for a proposed TV series based on the comic strip The Phantom. It is widely believed that the pilot never aired, but decades after it was filmed it leaked onto the internet.

The project was developed in 1956 with Roger Creed, a former stuntman, to play the Phantom.

The title of the pilot episode is "No Escape". It has been criticized as having an incoherent script which fails to provide important backstory and motivation for the characters or explanation for the settings.

Plot
The Phantom goes to a plantation owned by Mrs. Harris to find out who is killing various workers.

Cast
Roger Creed as The Phantom / Mr. Walker
Paulette Goddard as Mrs. Harris
Lon Chaney Jr. as Jed
Reginald Denny as Commissioner R.G. Mallory
Allan Nixon as Doc Sanders
Chaino
Marc Davis as Hardy
Richard Kiel as Big Mike

Production
The production of The Phantom was overseen by Al Brodax and Bob Duncan, with Phantom rights-holders King Features directly handling the project. Harold Daniels directed the pilot episode. Writer John Carr originally wrote four episodes, but because the pilot was not picked up by a network, the remaining three were never filmed. Actress Marilyn Manning had originally been cast as Diana Palmer, but never appeared in the pilot. Devil, Hero, and the Jungle Patrol all appear throughout the course of the story.

References

External links
The Phantom at IMDb

1961 films
1961 television films
American television films